Pergament may refer to:
 Parchment, alternative name
 Pergament Home Centers, a defunct home improvement store chain that primarily operated in New York

Persons with the surname
 Sarah Nyberg Pergament, Swedish electronica musician